Francis Yao Asare was a Ghanaian pharmacist and politician. He served on various ministerial portfolios and served as a member of parliament for the Buem constituency during the first republic.

Early life and education
Francis was born in Baroda in Southern Togoland. He was educated at Presbyterian School in Anum Mfantsipim School in Cape Coast.

Career and politics
He trained as a druggist at the Korle Bu Teaching Hospital and worked as a pharmacist for the Ghana Civil Service from 1940 to 1947. He served on Buem Krachi Native Authority, Southern Togoland Council and was elected to the Legislative Assembly representing Buem in 1951. That same year, he was appointed Ministerial Secretary (deputy minister) for the Ministry of Housing. He was later appointed Minister of Labour, Co-operatives and Social Welfare and acting Minister for Communications. In 1957 he was appointed Minister for Food and Agriculture. He worked in that capacity until June 1960. On 1 July 1960 he was appointed Commissioner (Regional Minister) for the Volta Region. He served in this capacity until 1961. He later became Chairman of the National Food and Nutrition Board. He was re-elected to represent the Buem constituency in subsequent years until 1965 when he was sentenced to twenty-one years imprisonment on charges of the defrauding the government an amount of over £1 million. After the overthrow of the Nkrumah government Francis went into fishing and was made president of the National Inshore Boat Owners Association.

Death
Francis died on 7 January 2004 at the age of 88. He was buried in his hometown; Buem.

References

2004 deaths
Ghanaian MPs 1951–1954
Ghanaian MPs 1954–1956
Ghanaian MPs 1956–1965
Labour ministers of Ghana
Mfantsipim School alumni
Convention People's Party (Ghana) politicians